A baati, or it’s more formal/traditional name Dirac shiid, is a Somali cotton house dress with a loose fit and short sleeves. It is very popular within the entirety of East Africa due to the Somali migrations and trading across this region. It is seen as a staple in many East African households. The garment is noted for its versatility; it can be used as swimwear or as a sling to carry an infant. It is one of the variants of the traditional Somali wear called Dirac.

In 2018, Miss Universe contestant Muna Juma accused fast fashion brand Zara of cultural appropriation because they advertised a dress closely resembling a baati.

See also
Dirac, a more formal Somali dress
Caftan

References

African clothing
Somali culture